The 2008-09 season is the 96th season of competitive football in Libya.

Overview
Aman al Aam, Wefaq Sabratha & Sweahly are all playing in the Premier League after winning promotion from the Libyan Second Division last season. Sweahly and Wefaq are returning after a 3-year absence, while Aman al Aam are making their debut as a re-incarnation of Al-Shorta Tripoli.
Ahly Benghazi, Hilal and Nasr are all playing at the Martyrs of February Stadium, the new LYD 20,000,000 project that opened on March 5, 2009

Events
On October 15, 2008, the Libyan Super Cup was won Ittihad as they defeated Khaleej Sirte 4-0 at 11 June Stadium

On October 17, 2008, the 2008-09 Libyan Premier League season started at the Green Document Stadium, at 14:00 GMT where Akhdar defeated Tersanah by 3 goals to 1.

On November 4, 2008, the 2008-09 Libyan Second Division season started.

On February 26, 2009, the 2008-09 Libyan Cup competition started

On May 28, 2009, Al Wahda Tripoli's relegation from the Libyan Premier League was confirmed after a 4-1 away defeat to Ahly Benghazi.

National team
The home team is on the left hand column; the away team is on the right hand column.

Friendly Matches

World Cup Qualifiers
Libya was in Group 4 of the 2010 FIFA World Cup qualification process

African Nations Championship
Libya was in the North Zone for qualification to the inaugural African Nations Championship

Qualifying - Final Round

First leg

Second leg

Libya advance to CHAN 2009 finals.

Finals
Libya were drawn in Group B, along with DR Congo, Ghana and Zimbabwe.

Performance in CAF competitions

Qualified Teams
 Ittihad - CAF Champions League 2009 (as Libyan Premier League 2007-08 winners)
 Ahly Tripoli - CAF Champions League 2009 (as Libyan Premier League 2007-08 runners-up)
 Ahly Benghazi - CAF Confederation Cup 2009 (as Libyan Premier League 2007-08 third-placed team)
 Khaleej Sirte - CAF Confederation Cup 2009 (as Libyan Cup 2007-08 winners)

Fixtures & Results

First round
NB: Ittihad received bye to Round of 32

Al Ahly Tripoli go through with an aggregate score of 7-2

Khaleej Sirte go through with an aggregate score of 6-0

Al Ahly Benghazi go through 3-2 on penalty kicks, after an aggregate score of 1-1.

Second round
First Legs to be played over March 13-March 15, 2009Second Legs to be played over April 3-April 5, 2009

Ahly Tripoli advance to the next stage of the competition with an aggregate score of 3–1.

Ittihad are eliminated from the competition with an aggregate score of 4–1

Ahly Benghazi are eliminated from the competition with an aggregate score of 5–3

Khaleej Sirte are eliminated from the competition with an aggregate score of 6–0

Third round
First legs to be played over April 17-April 19, 2009Second legs to be played over May 1-May 3, 2009

Ahly Tripoli are eliminated from the competition with an aggregate score of 2–0

Fourth round
First legs to be played over May 17-May 19, 2009Second legs to be played over May 29-May 31, 2009

Ahly Tripoli are eliminated from the competition with an aggregate score of 2–1

Performance in UAFA Competitions

Qualified Teams
Ittihad - Arab Champions League 2008-09 (as Libyan Premier League 2007-08 winners)
Ahly Tripoli - Arab Champions League 2008-09 (as Libyan Premier League 2007-08 runners-up)

Fixtures & Results
First legs to be played over October 27-October 29, 2008Second legs to be played over November 24-November 26, 2008

Ittihad are eliminated from the competition with an aggregate score of 3–2Al Ahly Tripoli are eliminated from the competition after losing a penalty shootout 9–8, after an aggregate score of 0–0Performance in UNAF Competitions

Qualified Teams
Ittihad - North African Cup of Champions (Libyan Premier League 2007-08 winners)
Khaleej Sirte - North African Cup Winners Cup (Libyan Cup 2007-08 winners)

Fixtures & Results

Khaleej Sirte are eliminated from the competition with an aggregate score of 4–0Ittihad are eliminated from the competition with an aggregate score of 3–2''

There was an ongoing feud as to who would take 3rd place. Ittihad were originally given 3rd place as JS Kabylie did not play a penalty shootout, as they claim they won the tie on away goals. The Algerian club also said that Ittihad had an unfair advantage playing at home in a one-off match. As a result, UNAF met on January 19 to discuss the case. The UNAF later decided that the two clubs would share 3rd place, and therefore share the $75,000 prize fund.

References